Area code 662 is a telephone area code in the North American Numbering Plan (NANP) for the northern half of the U.S. state of Mississippi, including the six counties (Benton, Coahoma, Desoto, Marshall, Tate and Tunica) that are part of the Memphis metro area. It also includes the cities that are home to the state's two largest universities, Oxford (University of Mississippi or "Ole Miss") and Starkville (Mississippi State University).

Area code 662 was created in 1999 in a split from area code 601, Mississippi's original area code created in 1947 as one of the original North American area codes.

Prior to October 2021, area code 662 had telephone numbers assigned for the central office code 988. In 2020, 988 was designated nationwide as a dialing code for the National Suicide Prevention Lifeline, which created a conflict for exchanges that permit seven-digit dialing. This area code was therefore scheduled to transition to ten-digit dialing by October 24, 2021.

In 2022, the NANP Administrator projected that northern Mississippi will need a second area code by late 2025.

Blues guitarist Christone "Kingfish" Ingram, who is from Clarksdale, named his second album and its title track "662" after his home area code.

Service area
The numbering plan area includes the following cities:

 Aberdeen
 Amory
 Artesia
 Baldwyn
 Batesville
 Belmont
 Booneville
 Clarksdale
 Cleveland
 Columbus
 Corinth
 Crawford
 Drew
 Fulton
 Greenville
 Greenwood
 Grenada
 Hernando
 Holly Springs
 Horn Lake
 Houston
 Indianola
 Kosciusko
 Louisville
 Marks
 Mound Bayou
 New Albany
 Okolona
 Olive Branch
 Oxford
 Pontotoc
 Ruleville
 Saltillo
 Senatobia
 Southaven
 Starkville
 Tunica
 Tupelo
 Vaiden
 Water Valley
 West Point
 Winona
 Yazoo City

References

External links
 NANPA: Mississippi area code map

1999 establishments in Mississippi
662
662